Ekaterina Galanta (born 1890s), often billed as Ketty Galanta, was a Russian dancer, a member of the Ballets Russes.

Early life 
Galanta was born and raised in Petrograd. In 1917 she was described as being 20 or 21 years old. Nikolai Legat was her first ballet teacher.

Career 

Galanta toured in the United States with the Ballets Russes in 1916, with Vaslav Nijinsky, Adolph Bolm, Flore Revalles, Lydia Lopokova, Olga Spessivtseva, and Valentina Kachouba, among others in the company of forty dancers. When the ballet company left the United States, she stayed behind to pursue a solo stage career. She danced at the Metropolitan Opera House in Petruschka (1916). While she was principal dancer in The Wanderer in New York in 1917, she was a mentor to American dancer Martha Lorber. In 1918 she was featured as a dancer in the musical Chu Chin Chow.

Herbert Brenon cast Galanta in the silent film The Fall of the Romanoffs (1917, now lost). One critic found her performance distracting, saying "Ketty Galanta is vivid in the role of Anna; [her eyes] roll in a fashion so marvelous that one fears they may pop out of her head; consequently, the audience gasps in wonderment when it should merely feel the thrill of emotion." She appeared in two more films, both directed by Brenon, Empty Pockets (1918), a murder mystery with Malcolm Williams, and The Passing of the Third Floor Back (1918), based on the Jerome K. Jerome play, and starring  Johnston Forbes-Robertson.

By 1922, Galanta moved to South America, where she taught dance at her own studio in Buenos Aires, Argentina. One of her students in Buenos Aires was María Fux. She was one of the founders of the Friends of Dance Association (AADA) there, along with fellow Ballets Russes dancer Tamara Grigorieva.

References

External links 
A photograph of Ekaterina Galanta from the George Grantham Bain collection, Library of Congress.
A 1923 photograph of Ekaterina Galanta, from the J. Willis Sayre Collection of Theatrical Photographs, University of Washington Libraries Digital Collections.

Russian dancers
1890s births
Year of death missing